Henryk Nowara (14 June 1924 – 28 November 2001) was a Polish boxer. He competed in the men's middleweight event at the 1952 Summer Olympics.

References

External links
 

1924 births
2001 deaths
Polish male boxers
Olympic boxers of Poland
Boxers at the 1952 Summer Olympics
Sportspeople from Chorzów
Middleweight boxers
21st-century Polish people
20th-century Polish people